Béla Zsitnik Jr. (born 7 November 1951) is a Hungarian rower. He competed in the men's eight event at the 1972 Summer Olympics.

References

External links
 
 
 

1951 births
Living people
Hungarian male rowers
Olympic rowers of Hungary
Rowers at the 1972 Summer Olympics
Rowers from Budapest